MATS (Mesospheric Airglow/Aerosol Tomography and Spectroscopy) is a Swedish research satellite designed for studying waves in Earth's atmosphere. Launch occurred on 4 November 2022 from the Rocket Lab Launch Complex 1 at the Mahia Peninsula in New Zealand.

MATS is planned to study atmospheric waves, providing data for atmospheric models monitoring future changes in the mesosphere, the atmospheric layer 50-100 km above sea level. In particular, MATS is designed to measure noctilucent clouds and atmospheric airglow from oxygen molecules.

References

External links
 MATS satellite at Swedish National Space Agency

Space programme of Sweden
Spacecraft launched in 2022
Spacecraft launched by Electron rockets